Cratogeomys is a genus of rodent in the family Geomyidae. It was previously considered a subgenus of Pappogeomys. All species are distributed in Mexico and the Southwest United States, with some species being found in both countries.

It contains the following seven species:
 Yellow-faced pocket gopher (Cratogeomys castanops)
 Oriental Basin pocket gopher (Cratogeomys fulvescens)
 Smoky pocket gopher (Cratogeomys fumosus)
 Goldman's pocket gopher (Cratogeomys goldmani)
 Merriam's pocket gopher (Cratogeomys merriami)
 Perote pocket gopher (Cratogeomys perotensis)
 Volcan de Toluca pocket gopher (Cratogeomys planiceps)

References

 
Rodent genera
Taxa named by Clinton Hart Merriam